Hunters Hill  is a suburb of the lower north shore of Sydney, in the state of New South Wales, Australia.

Hunters Hill is situated on a small peninsula that separates the Lane Cove and Parramatta Rivers. It can be reached by bus or by ferry.

History
The area's Aboriginal name is 'Mookaboola' or 'Moocooboola', which means meeting of waters.

Hunters Hill was named after John Hunter, the second Governor of New South Wales, who was in office between 1795 and 1800.

The area that is now Hunters Hill was settled in 1835. One of the earliest settlers was Mary Reibey, the first female retailer in Sydney. She built a cottage—later known as Fig Tree House—on land that fronted the Lane Cove River; Reiby Street is named after her. During the 1840s, bushrangers and convicts who had escaped from the penal settlement on Cockatoo Island would take refuge in Hunters Hill.

Many of the suburb's early houses were built from the local sandstone. A number were built by Frenchman Didier Numa Joubert (1816–1881), who bought  of land from Mary Reiby from 1847 and used seventy stonemasons from Italy to construct solid artistic houses. Hunters Hill was proclaimed as a municipality on 5 January 1861. The first Gladesville Bridge constructed in 1881 linked the area to Drummoyne and the southern side of the Parramatta River.

In the early 20th century, there was an industrial area in Hunters Hill. One of the industries was a radium and uranium refinery operating from 1911 to 1915. At the time, uranium was considered a byproduct, but very small quantities of radium (which had been discovered in 1898) were very valuable. The refinery could produce about 5 milligrammes of radium bromide from a ton of ore, worth  £20 per milligramme in 1912. The area is now residential, Nelson Parade, and demands to remove it saw a plan developed to transport it to an old quarry area besides Badgerys Creek that was licensed to receive low level radioactive waste; however all such planning ceased as Badgerys Creek International Airport was decided upon to proceed.

 Heritage listings 
Hunters Hill has a number of heritage-listed sites, including:
 38-40 Alexandra Street: Vienna, Hunters Hill
 12 Crescent Street: Milthorpe, Hunters Hill
 14 Crescent Street: Hestock
 Ferry Street: The Garibaldi
 Nelson Parade: Kellys Bush Park
 46 Ryde Road: Marika, Hunters Hill
 2 Yerton Avenue: The Chalet''

In addition, the following buildings are heritage-listed:

 Public School including Eulbertie, Alexandra Street
 Post Office, Alexandra Street
 Town Hall, Alexandra Street
 St Ives, Crescent Street
 Anglican Church of All Saints, corner Ferry and Ambrose Streets
 Kyarra, Madeline Street
 Fig Tree House, Reiby Road
 Clifton, Woolwich Road
 Waiwera, Woolwich Road
 St Claire, Wybalena Road
 Woolwich Dock, Franki Avenue, Woolwich

Houses
Developments are mostly residential.

Hunters Hill has a number of heritage-listed buildings and is positioned near the confluence of the Lane Cove and Parramatta Rivers, as well as the headwaters of Sydney Harbour, which provides river and harbour views. Previously having a number of residents of French extraction, it was known as the "French Village" and shares a friendship with a sister city near Paris, Le Vésinet.

Population

Demographics
In the 2016 census of Population and Housing, the population of Hunters Hill stood at 9,528 people. 69.1% of people were born in Australia. The most common countries of birth were England 4.0%, China 2.7%, New Zealand 1.4%, South Africa 1.2% and Italy 1.2%. The most common ancestries were English 22.7%, Australian 20.3%, Irish 11.2%, Scottish 6.8% and Chinese 5.3%. 76.4% of people only spoke English at home. Other languages spoken at home included Mandarin 3.0%, Italian 1.9%, Cantonese 1.8% and Greek 1.7%. The top responses for religious affiliation were Catholic 37.4%, No Religion 23.1% and Anglican 13.7%.

The median household weekly income was high at $2,700. Monthly mortgage payments were also high, with a median of $3,500 compared with the national figure of $1,755. According to the Australian Taxation Office statistics for the financial year of 2016-2017, the postcode of 2110 (Hunters Hill & Woolwich) had an average taxable income of $156,069 making it the 10th wealthiest suburb in Australia.

Notable residents
 Halse Rogers Arnott, chairman of Arnott's
 Henry Budden, architect
 Cate Blanchett, actress; and spouse, Andrew Upton, writer
 Stanley Gibbs, shipping clerk and George Cross recipient
 Delta Goodrem, singer and actress 
 Hugh Hipwell, filthiest human being award winner 2019
 Kristina Keneally, politician 
 Ben Keneally, politician
 Brian McFadden, singer
 Eddie Obeid, a former Labor politician 
 Ann Sanders, journalist
 Gil Wahlquist, journalist and winemaker
 Lang Walker, property developer

Politics 

Hunters Hill is in the federal electoral division of North Sydney. The former Treasurer of Australia Joe Hockey, held this seat from the 1996 federal election to 2015. 
 North Sydney is one of only two original divisions in New South Wales, along with Wentworth, which have never been held by the Australian Labor Party (ALP).

For NSW state elections, Hunters Hill is in the Electoral district of Lane Cove. As of 2003 this seat is held by Liberal MP Anthony Roberts, who was last re-elected in the 2007 state election.

Transport
Several bus routes run through Hunters Hill, consisting of:
252: King Street Wharf to Gladesville via Pacific Highway
505: Town Hall Station to Woolwich (peak only)
506: The Domain to Macquarie University via East Ryde
530: Burwood to Chatswood
536: Gladesville to Chatswood (peak only)
538: Gladesville to Woolwich

The closest ferry wharves to Hunters Hill are Valentia Street Wharf, Woolwich and Huntleys Point. Huntleys Point provides access to the Parramatta River ferry services which run between Circular Quay and Parramatta while Woolwich provides access to the Cockatoo Island ferry services which run between Circular Quay and Cockatoo Island.

Commercial areas
Hunters Hill has a few commercial areas. A group of shops is located on the corner of Alexandra and Ferry Streets, with others scattered further along these streets and on Woolwich Road.

The major commercial area is located around the intersection of Ryde Road and Gladesville Road, near the Burns Bay Road overpass and the Hunters Hill Hotel. It was re-developed in 2013.

Schools

Hunters Hill is the site of the AAGPS Catholic boys' secondary school, St Joseph's College. It is also home to Hunters Hill High School, Boronia Park Public School, Hunters Hill Primary School and Villa Maria Primary School.

Churches
There are two Catholic churches, Villa Maria Church in Mary Street and St Peter Chanel in the east of the suburb. Villa Maria is also the headquarters of the Marist Fathers in Australia; from the 1860s, it was the centre of their extensive missionary work in the Pacific. St Joseph's College includes a large chapel. The Catholic Church is associated with St Anne's Nursing Home, run by the Sisters of St Joseph.

Other churches are St Mark's and All Saints Anglican Churches and Hunters Hill Congregational Church.

Sport

Hunters Hill Tennis Club is one of the oldest sporting clubs in Australia.  Early history of the Club is obscure and no records are available showing the origins of the Club, however the Club existed in the 1860s making it one of the oldest operating tennis clubs in Sydney. Early courts were situated in Passy Avenue, Hunters Hill.  The first authentic record of the 'Hunters Hill Lawn Tennis Club' is a copy of the 1894 rules, stating the club was limited to 36 playing members, preference given to residents of Hunters Hill and club colours of Red, Green and Silver. Banjo Patterson is in newspaper records of having played at the club in the 1890s.  
It has had as members State and Interstate Champions, and an Australian entrant at the 1924 Wimbledon Championship, Alan Watt, who reached the fourth round of competition. The club has 5 lawn courts, and is one of the few remaining lawn court clubs in Sydney.

Hunters Hill Rugby Union Football Club was established in 1892 and competes in the New South Wales Suburban Rugby Union. It has won the Kentwell Cup 8 times and 1st Division club championship 5 times. The second most distinguished club in Subbies, it recently won the Stockdale Cup and Robertson Cup in 2010. The Robertson Cup was named after former Suburban Chairman (1978–80), Brian Robertson, this cup was first won by Port Hacking. After not being contested between 1988–93, the Robertson Cup was revived to become the Colts trophy for second division. The Farrant Cup was named after life member Don Farrant, a long-time supporter of sub-district rugby, Hunters Hill club stalwart Don Farrant presented the Farrant Cup to the MSDRU in 1974. Initially included in an expanded fourth division, it became the award for the Division Three second grade premiership in 1995.
Hunters Hill Rugby Union Football Club is a club that caters for all ages and level of ability, and plays matches at Boronia Park from March through to August.

Landmarks
There is a private hospital in Alexandra Street and in High Street, a Jewish nursing home and synagogue named the Sir Moses Montefiore Home. The historic Hunters Hill Town Hall is located in Alexandra Street, close to the historic post office.

The Great North Walk, a walking trail from Sydney to Newcastle, passes through Boronia Park; a large waterfront parkland reserve which contains Aboriginal drawings thought to date back to before the start of the colony.

Gallery

References

Citations

Sources 

 The Official Community Profile of Hunter's Hill

External links 
 The Official Community Profile of Hunter's Hill
 Hunter's Hill Municipality website
 2001 Census Information
 DiscoverHuntersHill Community Website
 Huntershillrugby.org.au
  [CC-By-SA]

 
Suburbs of Sydney
Municipality of Hunter's Hill